Whatever is the second studio album by American pop rock band Hot Chelle Rae. It was released by RCA Records on November 29, 2011, to generally favorable reviews from music critics. Three singles were released from the album: "Tonight Tonight" and "I Like It Like That", featuring New Boyz, and "Honestly".

Background
Hot Chelle Rae released their single "Tonight Tonight" in March 2011, prior to the release of their "Whatever" album the following November. The success of this single, which went double Platinum, led to Hot Chelle Rae being named the 2011 winners of the AMA's "Best New Artist" award. The band then spent the summer of 2011 touring with artists including Mike Posner, Justin Bieber, We the Kings, and the Script.

Hot Chelle Rae released their second single "I Like It Like That" in October 2011, before releasing the full "Whatever" album on November 29, 2011.

The cover art of the "Whatever" album, which features the four band members in separate colored squares was referred to by Cambio.com as drawing "inspiration from something in between the memory game Simon and the work of Andy Warhol".

Reception
Whatever gained mixed reviews from music critics. It holds a Metacritic "generally positive reviews" score of 62 out of 100. Allmusic gave it 3 and a half stars, and stated that Whatever "may not be a formula designed for critical acclaim or longevity, but pop music has always been exactly like this and HCR would make Bobby Vee, the Archies, and the New Radicals proud."

The album debuted at number 48 on the Billboard 200, selling over 18,000 copies in its first week, and debuted at number 166 in Canada.

"Whatever" gained recognition from critics including USA Todays Brian Mansfield for the multitude of pop-culture references in its tracks. The songs of the "Whatever" album include many notable references to 2011 pop culture including the actor Zach Galifianakis, the Hollywood Sign, beer pong, Facebook, and Skype.

Music critic Jon Caramanica of The New York Times compared Hot Chelle Rae's "Whatever" album to "the early breakthroughs" of bands including Sum 41 and Blink-182.

Although many critics gave "Whatever" relatively positive reviews, others criticized the album as lacking staying power, or being relatable mainly to teen audiences. In a November 2011 review on the website The Wrap, music critic Chris Williams said the album, "has captivated the Radio Disney demographic, but more mature listeners will take the impassive album title to heart".

Track listing
The track listing was revealed on October 25, 2011. Songwriting credits and producers per album liner notes.

PersonnelHot Chelle RaeRyan Follesé – lead vocals, guitar, keyboard
Nash Overstreet – guitars, backing vocals
Ian Keaggy – bass, backing vocals
Jamie Follesé – drums, percussionProduction'
Emanuel Kiriakou – producer
S*A*M and Sluggo – producer
Alexei Misoul – producer
Andrew Goldstein – producer, mixing
Dan Book – producer
Scott Mann – producer
Chad Royce – producer
Jens Koerkemier – additional production
Nash Overstreet – additional production
Matty Green – mixing
Serban Ghenea – mixing
Sarah Kraus – photography

Charts

References

2011 albums
Hot Chelle Rae albums
Jive Records albums
Albums produced by Andrew Goldstein (musician)